Ch'aska Urqu (Quechua ch'aska tousled / star, urqu mountain, "tousled mountain" or "star mountain", also spelled Chasca Orkho) is a mountain in the Andes of Bolivia, about  high. It is situated in the Potosí Department, Sud Lípez Province, San Pablo de Lípez Municipality. Ch'aska Urqu lies west of the mountain Muruq'u and north-east of the mountains Palti Urqu and Q'illu Urqu.

References 

Mountains of Potosí Department